"Opportunity" is a song by Australian singer-songwriter Pete Murray. It was released in March 2006 as the second single from Murray's third studio album, See the Sun (2005). "Opportunity" peaked at number 29 on the ARIA Singles Chart. At the APRA Music Awards of 2007, the song was nominated for Most Performed Australian Work.

Track listing
 "Opportunity" – 3:37
 "Empty" – 2:42
 "Unfinished" – 4:09
 "Sinner" – 3:18

Charts

Weekly charts

Year-end charts

Release history

References

2005 songs
2006 singles
Columbia Records singles
Pete Murray (Australian singer-songwriter) songs
Songs written by Pete Murray (Australian singer-songwriter)
Sony BMG singles